Enoch Poor (June 21, 1736 (Old Style) – September 8, 1780) was a brigadier general in the Continental Army during the American Revolutionary War. He was a ship builder and merchant from Exeter, New Hampshire.

Biography

Poor was born and raised in Andover, Massachusetts. His father Thomas Poor had been part of the 1745 expedition that captured Louisburg, Nova Scotia, during King George's War. In 1755, Poor enlisted as a private in one of the Massachusetts units raised to accompany Jeffery Amherst's expedition to retake Louisburg during the French and Indian War. His unit enforced the expulsion of the Acadians. After the war, he came home to Andover, but only briefly. He eloped with Martha Osgood, and they settled in Exeter where he became a successful ship builder.

Poor supported the separatists as early as the Stamp Act protests in 1765. He served on various committees for Exeter throughout the period of rising rebellion. In 1775, he was twice elected to the provincial Assembly. The Battle of Lexington caused the assembly to call for three regiments of militia, and Poor became the colonel of the 2nd New Hampshire Regiment. The other regiments under colonels John Stark and James Reed were sent to Boston, but the 2nd was stationed at Portsmouth and Exeter. They were sent to Boston after the Battle of Bunker Hill, arriving on June 25. In the summer of 1775, the unit was absorbed into the Continental Army; they were ordered into the Northern Department and went with General Richard Montgomery's invasion of Canada.

After the disaster in Canada, Poor led the survivors of his regiment in early 1776 back to Fort Ticonderoga. The unit was renamed as the 8th Continental regiment and joined Washington's main army in December 1776 at winter quarters near Morristown, New Jersey.

The Continental Congress named Poor a brigadier general on February 21, 1777. That spring, his brigade was sent back to Ticonderoga. He withdrew with the rest of Arthur St. Clair's force of July 5. Moving south, they joined General Horatio Gates before the Battle of Saratoga, and his brigade was expanded by two regiments of Connecticut militia (Cook's and Latimer's).

In the Battle of Freeman's Farm, Poor's brigade was the first to come to the aid of Daniel Morgan's attack. Poor held the American left flank, extending into the woods and even wrapping around the British position. They performed well, keeping General Simon Fraser's regulars engaged while Benedict Arnold led attacks on the central column.

In the Battle of Bemis Heights, Poor's brigade was in General Benjamin Lincoln's division on the western end of the American line. They were closest to the center of the advancing British, so they came under fire from the grenadier battalion of the British center. The fire was ineffective, so Major John Dyke Acland led the grenadiers in a bayonet charge. Poor held fire until they came very close, then opened up with the massed fire of his 1,400 men. These were the first American shots in the battle. The charge was completely broken, and Acland himself fell wounded. With this collapse of Burgoyne's center, the Americans captured the wounded Acland and Major Williams along with the column's artillery. Poor then turned to his left and gave support to Ebenezer Learned and Morgan's men.

Poor's brigade again spent the winter with the main army, this time at Valley Forge. He led the last maneuvers in the Battle of Monmouth on June 28, 1778. He accompanied the Sullivan Expedition in 1779, leading a brigade in the victory at Battle of Newtown.

Afterward Poor was assigned to Lafayette's division and mainly saw garrison duty in New Jersey. Some sources say that Poor was shot in a duel near Hackensack, New Jersey, on September 6, 1780, and died two days later from the wound, (according to the journal of soldier Elijah Fisher, Poor was in a duel with "a Major" and died two days later.) although the Army surgeon reported that he died from typhus. He was buried in the First Reformed Dutch Church Cemetery in Hackensack. George Washington and Lafayette both attended his funeral, and Washington wrote to inform Congress of Poor's death. He noted that "he was an officer of distinguished merit, one who as a citizen and soldier had every claim to the esteem and regard of his country."

See also
 New Hampshire Historical Marker No. 131: Brigadier General Enoch Poor

References

External links
 A General on The Sullivan-Clinton Campaign Vs. Iroquoia
 State Builders: An Illustrated Historical and Biographical Record of the State of New Hampshire. State Builders Publishing Manchester, NH 1903

1736 births
1780 deaths
Continental Army generals
Continental Army officers from New Hampshire
People of New Hampshire in the French and Indian War
People of colonial Massachusetts
People of New Hampshire in the American Revolution
People of colonial New Hampshire
Burials at First Reformed Dutch Church, Hackensack